The Bayer Uerdingen Cricket Ground is a cricket ground in Krefeld, Germany. Built to international standards, it is part of Germany's national cricket performance centre, which includes a three lane indoor training net facility.

The performance centre, a joint venture between the German Cricket Federation and SC Bayer 05 Uerdingen, a local sports club, is located at and adjacent to the Bayer Sportstadion. It was constructed over the winter of 2020–21.

In July 2021, the ground was the venue for the first ever Women's Twenty20 Internationals to be held in Germany, when Germany's women's team hosted a touring French women's team in a five-match bilateral series. Early the following month, the ground hosted the first Twenty20 Internationals to be held in Germany, when the German Cricket Federation staged a trilateral series there between Germany, Norway and France.

References

External links 
 Cricket at Bayer 05 Uerdingen

Sports venues completed in 2021
Cricket grounds in Germany
Sport in Krefeld
2021 establishments in Germany